Thanatta Chawong is a Thai international footballer currently playing as a forward.

Clubs

International goals

References

External links
 
 
Thai Football players join Swedish team Embassy of Sweden
Profile  at Östersunds

1989 births
Living people
Thanatta Chawong
2015 FIFA Women's World Cup players
Expatriate women's footballers in Sweden
Women's association football forwards
Footballers at the 2006 Asian Games
Footballers at the 2010 Asian Games
Thanatta Chawong
Thanatta Chawong
Thanatta Chawong